Nahuel Sachak, known as Nahuel (born in Colonia Luz Bella in Guayaibí, San Pedro Department, Paraguay in 1991) is a Paraguayan singer who, on the final held on 21 February 2011, became the winner of eighth season of Operación Triunfo in Spain.

Biography 
Nahuel who comes from a farming family was the first non-Spanish-born contestant to win the reality television talent competition Operación Triunfo, although he had been living in Spain since 2005. He emigrated to Spain with his mother Julia Chavez for economic reasons. He is also an avid sportsman and a football (soccer) player.

At present he performs around the world with his band Los Latinos Paraguayos on board of cruise boats.

In 2022 he presents his álbum Mil noches, available at the moment in all digital platforms and he is on tour with his show throughout Spain.

Discography

Singles 
 2011: En cualquier lugar
 2011: Mientras te vas
 2022: Dónde estás?

Collaborations 
 2016: ¿Dónde estás? duet with José Vera

Music videos 
 2011: Mientras te vas
 2016: ¿Dónde estás? with José Vera
 2022: Dónde estás? Single del Álbum Mil noches

References

External links

1991 births
Living people
21st-century Paraguayan male singers
Star Academy participants
Star Academy winners
Operación Triunfo contestants